Ghusuri is a locality of North Howrah in Howrah district of Indian state of West Bengal. It is under 170-Howrah Uttar (Vidhan Sabha constituency) and 25-Howrah (Lok Sabha constituency).  It is a part of the area covered by Kolkata Metropolitan Development Authority (KMDA).

Ghusuri is under the jurisdiction of Malipanchghara Police Station of Howrah City Police.

Location
Ghusuri is situated on the west bank of Hooghly River. It lies on the east of Liluah, between Salkia and Belur.

Transport
State Highway 6 (West Bengal)/ Grand Trunk Road passes through the west side of Ghusuri. Jogendranath Mukherjee Road runs along the eastern part of Ghusuri.

Bus

Private Bus
 51 Pardankuni - Howrah Station
 54 Bally Khal – Esplanade
 56 Ruiya Purbapara - Howrah Station

Mini Bus
 1A Satyabala – Ruby Hospital
 10 Bally Khal – Khidirpur
 11 Belur Math – Esplanade
 25 Malipanchghara – Sealdah/Rajabazar

CSTC Bus
 S32A Belgharia (Rathtala) - Howrah Station

Train
Liluah railway station is the nearest railway station.

References

Cities and towns in Howrah district
Neighbourhoods in Howrah
Kolkata Metropolitan Area
Neighbourhoods in Kolkata